Aleksandra Aleksandrovna Ekster (née Grigorovich) (18 January 1882 – 17 March 1949), also known as Alexandra Exter, was a Russian and French painter and designer.

As a young woman, her studio in Kiev attracted all the city's creative luminaries, and she became a figure of the Paris salons, mixing with Picasso, Braque and others. She is identified with the Russian/Ukrainian avant-garde, as a Cubo-futurist, Constructivist, and influencer of the Art Deco movement.

Biography

Childhood
She was born Aleksandra Aleksandrovna Grigorovich in Białystok, in the Grodno Governorate of the Russian Empire (now Poland) to a wealthy Belarusian family. Her father, Aleksandr Grigorovich, was a wealthy Belarusian businessman. Her mother was Greek. Young Aleksandra received an excellent private education, studying languages, music, art, and taking private drawing lessons. Soon her parents moved to Kiev, and Asya, as called by her friends, attended Kiev gymnasium St. Olga and Kiev Art School, where she studied with Alexander Bogomazov and Alexander Archipenko. Her teachers included Mykola Pymonenko. Aleksandra graduated in painting from Kiev Art School in 1906.

Marriage
In 1908, Aleksandra Grigorovich married a successful Kiev lawyer, Nikolai Evgenyevich Ekster. The Eksters belonged to cultural and intellectual elite of Kiev. She spent several months with her husband in Paris, and there she attended Académie de la Grande Chaumière in Montparnasse. From 1908 to 1924, she intermittently lived in Kiev, St. Petersburg, Odessa, Paris, Rome and Moscow.

Kiev
Her painting studio in the attic at 27 Funduklievskaya Street, now Khmelnytsky Street, was a rallying stage for Kiev's intellectual elite. In the attic in her studio there worked future luminaries of world decorative art Vadim Meller, Anatole Petrytsky and P. Tchelitchew. There she was visited by poets and writers, such as Anna Akhmatova, Ilia Ehrenburg, and Osip Mandelstam, choreographer Bronislava Nijinska and dancer Elsa Kruger, as well as many artists Alexander Bogomazov, Wladimir Baranoff-Rossine, and students, such as Grigori Kozintsev, Sergei Yutkevich, Aleksei Kapler and Abraham Mintchine among many others. In 1908, she participated in an exhibition together with members of the group Zveno (Link) organized by David Burliuk, Wladimir Burliuk and others in Kiev.

Paris
In Paris, Aleksandra Ekster became personally acquainted with Pablo Picasso and Georges Braque, who introduced her to Gertrude Stein.

Under the name Alexandra d'Exter she exhibited six works at the Salon de la Section d'Or, Galerie La Boétie, Paris, October 1912, with Jean Metzinger, Albert Gleizes, Marcel Duchamp and others.

In 1914, Exter participated in the Salon des Indépendants exhibitions in Paris, together with Kazimir Malevich, Alexander Archipenko, Vadym Meller, Sonia Delaunay-Terk and other French and Russian artists. In that same year, she participated with the "Russians" Archipenko, Koulbine and Rozanova in the International Futurist Exhibition in Rome. In 1915, she joined the group of avant-garde artists Supremus. Her friend introduced her to the poet Apollinaire, who took her to Picasso's workshop. According to Moscow Chamber Theatre actress Alice Coonen, "In [Ekster's] Parisian household there was a conspicuous peculiar combination of European culture with Ukrainian life. On the walls between Picasso and Braque paintings, there was Ukrainian embroidery; on the floor was a Ukrainian carpet, at the table they served clay pots, colorful majolica plates of dumplings."

Russian avant-garde

Under the avant-garde umbrella, Ekster has been noted to be a suprematist and constructivist painter as well as a major influencer of the Art Deco movement.

While not confined within a particular movement, Ekster was one of the most experimental women of the avant-garde. Ekster absorbed from many sources and cultures in order to develop her own original style. In 1915–1916, she worked in the peasant craft cooperatives in the villages Skoptsi and Verbovka along with Kazimir Malevich, Yevgenia Pribylskaya, Natalia Davidova, Nina Genke, Liubov Popova, Ivan Puni, Olga Rozanova, Nadezhda Udaltsova and others. Ekster later founded a teaching and production workshop (MDI) in Kyiv (1918–1920). Alexander Tyshler, Vadym Meller, Anatol Petrytsky, Kliment Red'ko, Tchelitchew, Shifrin, Nikritin worked there. Also during this period she was one of the leading stage designers of Alexander Tairov's Chamber Theatre.

In 1919, together with other avant-garde artists Kliment Red'ko and Nina Genke-Meller, she decorated the streets and squares of Kiev and Odessa in abstract style for Revolution Festivities. She worked with Vadym Meller as a costume designer in a ballet studio of the dancer Bronislava Nijinska.

In 1921, she became a director of the elementary course Color at the Higher Artistic-Technical Workshop (VKhUTEMAS) in Moscow, a position she held until 1924. Her work was displayed alongside that of other Constructivist artists at the 5x5=25 exhibition held in Moscow in 1921.

In line with her eclectic avant-garde-like style, Ekster's early paintings strongly influenced her costume design as well as her book illustrations, which are scarcely noted. All of Ekster's works, no matter the medium, stick to her distinct style. Her works are vibrant, playful, dramatic, and theatrical in composition, subject matter, and color. Ekster constantly stayed true to her composition aesthetic across all mediums. Furthermore, each medium only enhanced and influenced her work in other mediums.

With her assimilation of many different genres her essential futurist and cubist ideas was always in tandem with her attention to colour and rhythm. Ekster uses many elements of geometric compositions, which reinforce the core intentions of dynamism, vibrant contrasts, and free brushwork. Ekster stretched the dynamic intentions of her work across all mediums. Ekster's theatrical works such as sculptures, costume design, set design, and decorations for the revolutionary festivals, strongly reflect her work with geometric elements and vibrant intentions. Through her costume work, she experimented with the transparency, movement, and vibrancy of fabrics. Ekster's movement of her brushstroke in her artwork is reflected in the movement of the fabric in her costumes. Ekster's theatrical sets used multi-coloured dimensions and experimented with spatial structures. She continued with these experimental tendencies in her later puppet designs. With her experimentation across many mediums, Ekster started to take the concept of her costume designing and integrate it into everyday life. In 1921, Ekster's work in fashion design began. Though her mass production designs were wearable, most of her fashion design was highly decorative and innovative, usually falling under the category of haute couture.

In 1923, she continued her work in many media in addition to collaborating with Vera Mukhina and Boris Gladkov in Moscow on the decor of the All Russian Exhibition pavilions.

Emigration
In 1924, Aleksandra Ekster and her husband emigrated to France and settled in Paris, where she initially became a professor at the Academie Moderne. From 1926 to 1930, Ekster was a professor at Fernand Léger's Académie d'Art Contemporain. In 1933, she began creating beautiful and original illuminated manuscripts (gouache on paper), perhaps the most important works of the last phase of her life. The "Callimaque" manuscript (c. 1939, the text being a French translation of a hymn by Hellenistic poet Callimachus) is widely regarded as her masterpiece. In 1936, she participated in the exhibition Cubism and Abstract Art in New York and went on to have solo exhibitions in Prague and in Paris. She was a book illustrator for the publishing company Flammarion in Paris from 1936 until her death in the Paris suburb of Fontenay-aux-Roses. During the past few decades, her reputation has increased dramatically, as have the prices of her works. As a consequence, several fakes have appeared on the market in recent years.

References

External links

Alexandra Ekster, Georgiy Kovalenko, 1993, Galart, Moscow, Russia.
 Andrei Nakov, Art Historian, about Alexandra Exter
 Alexandra Exter Association
 
 
 Хидекель Р. П. О трех художниках Камерного театра.  // Искусство. – 1971. – No. 5. С. 37–43. (Khidekel R.P. About three artists of the Kamerny Theatre. Alexandra Exter, Georgy Yakulov and Alexander Vesnin// Iskusstvo. – 1971. – No. 5. p. 37–43)
Oxford Index
 W.H. Crain Costume and Scene Design Collection at the Harry Ransom Center

1882 births
1949 deaths
People from Białystok
People from Belostoksky Uyezd
20th-century Russian painters
20th-century French painters
Art Deco artists
Ukrainian artists
Modern painters
Abstract painters
Modernist theatre
Russian costume designers
Russian scenic designers
Russian women painters
Ukrainian women artists
Ukrainian avant-garde
Ukrainian Futurism
Russian avant-garde
Suprematism (art movement)
White Russian emigrants to France
20th-century Russian women artists
Emigrants from the Russian Empire to France
Alumni of the Académie de la Grande Chaumière
Academic staff of Vkhutemas
Artists from Białystok